Micronecta poweri is a species of water boatman in the family Corixidae in the order Hemiptera.

References

Micronectinae
Insects described in 1869